Primary Motive is a 1992 American thriller film written and directed by Daniel Adams.

Plot

Cast 
Judd Nelson as Andrew Blumenthal
Richard Jordan as Chris Poulas
Sally Kirkland as Helen Poulas
Justine Bateman as Darcy Link
John Savage as Wallace Roberts
Frank Converse as John Eastham
Joe Grifasi as Paul Melton
Larry "Ratso" Sloman as Charlie Phelps
Malachi Throne as Ken Blumenthal
John Bedford Lloyd as Pat O'Hara
Daniel Adams as Fisherman
Tatyana Yassukovich as Poulas' receptionist
Maggie Wagner as Betty Sullivan
Bill Siegel as Republican State chairman

References

External links

 

1992 films
American thriller films
Films scored by John Cale
1992 thriller films
Films directed by Daniel Adams (director)
1990s English-language films
1990s American films